Byrrhinae is a subfamily of pill beetles in the family Byrrhidae. There are about 25 genera and at least 160 described species in Byrrhinae.

Genera
These 25 genera belong to the subfamily Byrrhinae:

 Akidomorychus Lawrence, 2013
 Arctobyrrhus Münster, 1902
 Brachybyrrhulus Lawrence, 2013
 Byrrhochomus Fabbri, 2003
 Byrrhus Linnaeus, 1758
 Carpathobyrrhulus Ganglbauer, 1902
 Chrysobyrrhulus Reitter, 1911
 Curimus Erichson, 1846
 Cytilus Erichson, 1847
 Eusomalia Casey, 1912
 Exomella Casey, 1912
 Idiothrix Lawrence, 2013
 Lamprobyrrhulus Ganglbauer, 1902
 Lasiomorychus Ganglbauer, 1902
 Lioligus Casey, 1912
 Lioon Casey, 1912
 Listemus Casey, 1912
 Morychus Erichson, 1847
 Nothochaetes Lawrence, 2013
 Notolioon Lawrence, 2013
 Pedilophorus Steffahny, 1842
 Porcinolus Mulsant, 1869
 Pseudomorychus Lawrence, 2013
 Simplocaria Stephens, 1830
 Trichobyrrhulus Ganglbauer, 1902

References

Further reading

External links

 

Byrrhidae